Beilschmiedia miersii (Northern acorn tree, Belloto del norte: in Spanish), an evergreen tree in the Lauraceae native to central Chile from 30 to 35°S., up to 1200 meters (4000 ft) above sea level and lives under very dry conditions.

A type locality for B. miersii is the La Campana National Park and Cerro La Campana, where it is associated with the endangered Chilean Wine Palm.

Description
Reaches 25 meters (82 ft) height and 80 cm (31 in) diameter. Straight and cylindrical trunk. Gray-brownish bark. Leaves are simple, opposite and subopposite, aovate to aovate-elliptical, entire margin, wavy, above they are dark and glossy, below they are glaucous, obtuse to emarginate apex, obtuse to slightly subcordate base, the leaves are about 4–11 cm long and 1,5–5 cm wide, petioles very pubescent about 5–10 mm long. Flowers are hermaphrodite, in inflorescences about 3–10 cm; pedicellate about 2–5 mm, yellow greenish, pubescent and fleshy tepals, the style ends in a papillose and obtuse stigma.

Cultivation and uses
In central Chile this species is used as an ornamental. Its fruit is a brown drupe when ripe and is sometimes used for feeding pigs. It has also been planted and acclimatized in Spain.

References

P. Hechenleitner, M. Gardner, P. Thomas, C. Echeverría, B. Escobar, P. Brownless and C. Martínez. 2005. Plantas Amenazadas del Centro-Sur de Chile. Distribución, Conservación y Propagación. Primera Edición. Universidad Austral de Chile y Real Jardín Botánico de Edimburgo, Valdivia. 188p.
C. Michael Hogan. 2008. Chilean Wine Palm: Jubaea chilensis, GlobalTwitcher.com, ed. N. Stromberg
R. Rodríguez and M. Quezada. 2001. Laurales. En C. Marticorena y R. Rodríguez [eds.], Flora de Chile Vol. 2, pp 10–19. Universidad de Concepción, Concepción.

Line notes

External links
Beilschmiedia miersii in Encyclopedia of Chilean Flora

Trees of Chile
miersii
Drought-tolerant trees
Ornamental trees
Trees of Mediterranean climate